Grigol (Giorgi) Chanturia (born 25 September 1973) is a Georgian retired footballer.

Career
Chanturia was a regular for Torpedo Kutaisi until the arrival of international footballer Nikoloz Togonidze, Irakli Zoidze, Davit Gvaramadze and Zviad Sturua.

International career
Chanturia played for Georgia as backup of Giorgi Lomaia.

External links

Footballers from Georgia (country)
Expatriate footballers from Georgia (country)
Georgia (country) international footballers
Expatriate footballers in Russia
Expatriate footballers in Ukraine
Expatriate sportspeople from Georgia (country) in Ukraine
Association football goalkeepers
1973 births
Living people
SC Tavriya Simferopol players
FC Hoverla Uzhhorod players
FC Dinamo Batumi players
FC Metalurgi Rustavi players
Ukrainian Premier League players
FC Lokomotiv Saint Petersburg players